The Intel Extreme Masters Season X – World Championship or IEM Season X – Katowice was the world championship for the tenth season of the Intel Extreme Masters. It was held at the Spodek in Katowice, Silesian Voivodeship, Poland from March 2–6, 2016.

The Counter-Strike: Global Offensive portion was won by fnatic 3–0 with a roster consisting of Olofmeister, JW, flusha, krimz, and dennis against Luminosity Gaming.

League of Legends was won by SK Telecom T1 against fnatic. Both organizations had teams in both grand finals.

Counter-Strike: Global Offensive

Final standings

League of Legends

Final standings

References

External links
 

Intel Extreme Masters
2016 in esports
Katowice
Counter-Strike competitions
League of Legends competitions